The Flappy snake-eel (Phyllophichthus xenodontus) is an eel in the family Ophichthidae (worm/snake eels), and the only species in the genus Phyllophichthus. It was described by William Alonzo Gosline III in 1951. It is a marine, tropical eel which is known from the Indo-Pacific, including East Africa, the Hawaiian Islands, the Marquesan Islands, the Society Islands, the Caroline Islands and the Marshall Islands. It dwells at a depth range of 8–30 metres, and inhabits reefs and inshore waters. It leads a benthic lifestyle, and forms burrows. Males can reach a maximum total length of 42 centimetres.

References

Ophichthidae
Taxa named by William Alonzo Gosline III
Fish described in 1951